Hillside is a historic house in Natchez, Mississippi, USA. It was built in the 1850s for Mrs. Jeremiah Cory, her daughter and her son-in-law, W. G. Foules. It has been listed on the National Register of Historic Places since September 15, 1987.

References

Houses on the National Register of Historic Places in Mississippi
Greek Revival houses in Mississippi
Houses completed in 1855
Houses in Adams County, Mississippi
Antebellum architecture
National Register of Historic Places in Adams County, Mississippi